Oldham bus station is a bus station located in the town of Oldham in Greater Manchester. The bus station is found on Cheapside at the junction of West Street. The bus station opened in January 2001 and replaced the previous bus station at Town Square and the bus stops on Cheapside and West Street. The bus station is run by Transport for Greater Manchester.

History
In the past, there were three termini in Oldham, West Street, Town Square and Mumps Bridge with services terminating in Oldham, arriving from western areas, at West Street and services arriving from eastern areas terminating at Town Square. Mumps Bridge is used as a terminus for First Greater Manchester (formerly GM Buses/GM Buses North) services, as the depot is located at Mumps Bridge. When the bus station opened, all services terminating in the town (with the exception of some First service which terminate at Mumps Bridge) would terminate at the new bus station.

The new station opened in January 2001 and within the first two years of opening, it won two awards. Originally, there were eight stands in the bus station, A to H. Due to the number of buses arriving in Oldham every hour, plus National Express coaches which also uses the bus station as a stopping place, it was decided, to avoid congestion, that some services would use bus stops on West Street, which is around the corner from the bus station. After complaints from passengers waiting for buses on West Street of suffering from the elements, GMPTE decided to build a smaller bus station, based on the one on Cheapside for West Street. This opened in September 2006 at a cost of £2.2m. Now, there are, in total, 12 stands, from A to H and J to M.

Services
The majority of bus services are run by First Greater Manchester with other services run by operators including Stagecoach Manchester, Stotts and Manchester Community Transport. 

There are frequent buses running to a large number of surrounding areas of Oldham and Greater Manchester including Manchester, Middleton, Rochdale, Saddleworth and Tameside, with one service running out of the region into West Yorkshire to Huddersfield.

Safety concerns

One problem with Oldham bus station is the safety of the crossings. In January 2007, 56-year-old Ann Kerridge was killed after being knocked down by a bus on a crossing at the bus station with husband Brian dying shortly afterwards, which the family believed was caused by a broken heart. Following another accident at the same crossing in September 2007 and a report by GMPTE obtained by the Oldham Evening Chronicle newspaper that shows potentially fatal flaws at the two crossings at the ends of the bus station, one being near the entrance to the Travelshop and the other near the junction of St Mary's Way, it had led to the family of Ann Kerridge to demand that the crossing should be closed.

The problem with the two crossings is that bus drivers approach the crossing on a 90 degree bend, which would restrict the view of both the driver and the pedestrian, sometimes approaching the crossing slightly too fast. Also some drivers have been known to have stopped at the junction waiting to turn right out of the bus station, blocking the crossing, making it harder and more dangerous for pedestrians to cross over. Following the report from GMPTE, the pedestrian crossings have been re-allocated to the sides of the bus station next to stands G and H.

References

Bus stations in Greater Manchester
Buildings and structures in Oldham